Heathfield railway station may refer to :

Heathfield railway station (Devon), England
Heathfield railway station (East Sussex), England
Heathfield railway station, Adelaide, South Australia